Rock 'n' Roll High School is a 1979 American musical comedy film directed by Allan Arkush, produced by Michael Finnell, and starring P. J. Soles, Vince Van Patten, Clint Howard, and Dey Young. The film featured the punk rock group Ramones.

Plot
The film is set in 1980. Vince Lombardi High School keeps losing principals to nervous breakdowns because of the students' love of rock 'n' roll and their disregard for education. The leader of the students, Riff Randell, is the biggest Ramones fan at the school and also the worst behavioral problem, in that her disciplinary record fills an entire filing cabinet. She waits in line for three days to get tickets to see the band, hoping to meet Joey Ramone so she can give him a song she wrote for the band, "Rock 'n' Roll High School".

When the tyrannical Principal Togar takes her ticket away, Riff and her best friend Kate Rambeau have to find another way to meet their heroes: winning a radio contest. Riff succeeds in delivering her song to Joey Ramone, but the next day Principal Togar and a group of parents attempt to burn a pile of rock records. In response, the students, joined by the Ramones (who are made honorary students), overthrow the teachers and hall monitors to take over the high school, with Principal Togar asking the musicians "Do your parents know you're Ramones?" When the police are summoned and demand that the students evacuate the building, they do so, but then the students and the Ramones burn down the school as a final act of youthful rebellion.

Cast

Production
Roger Corman, executive producer of the film, was looking to make a modern teen film similar to the ones he made in his early career during the 1960s, with the focus on current music of the time. The initial title Disco High was selected for a story idea from Allan Arkush and Joe Dante. A script was developed by Richard Whitley, Russ Dvonch, and Joseph McBride. During this time, the film went through several different title changes including Heavy Metal Kids and Girl's Gym. Arkush directed the majority of the film, but Dante also helped when Arkush was suffering from exhaustion.

Corman originally wanted Cheap Trick or Todd Rundgren to play the band, but due to a conflict of schedules, he was forced to find an alternative. The Ramones were suggested by Paul Bartel, one of the actors in the film.

The genesis for the plot was a favorite story told to the film's original writer by his father, Raymond E. McBride of the Milwaukee Journal, who staged a walkout from his Superior (Wis.) Central High school in the 1920s.

The film was shot on the campus of the defunct Mount Carmel High School in South Central Los Angeles, that had been closed in 1976. The nighttime school explosions and fires were so great that many were scared away by and, temporarily, would not return to the on campus sets. Another location used for filming was Mira Costa High School in Manhattan Beach, California. The American football uniforms and cheer-leading outfits were those from MCHS.

Release
The film was theatrically released on August 24, 1979.

Home media
Rock 'n' Roll High School was originally released on VHS by Warner Home Video in 1983, and was later re-released on VHS in 1996 by New Horizons Home Video. A year later, in 1997, it was issued on DVD by Lumivision. A second DVD release occurred in 1999 from Slingshot. Shortly after Joey Ramone's death in 2001, New Concorde produced a third DVD release. The film was once again issued on DVD in 2005 by Buena Vista Home Entertainment. DVDs in the PAL format were issued by Umbrella Entertainment in 2003 and again in 2007.

The film was a part of Shout! Factory's Roger Corman Cult Classics series, reissued on DVD in May 2010. Shout! Factory released the film with exclusive content on Blu-ray on May 11, 2010 and again on November 19, 2019, with a new 4K restoration.

Soundtrack

A soundtrack album on Sire/Warner Bros. Records was released around the same time, but it included only a limited number of songs from the film. The two main Ramones songs (the title song and "I Want You Around") were recorded by Ed Stasium but remixed by Phil Spector for the soundtrack album. The original Ed Stasium mixes were not issued until the compilation album Ramones Mania (1988) and the compilation album Hey! Ho! Let's Go: The Anthology (1999), respectively.

Other songs appearing in the film include:
 Bent Fabric – "Alley Cat"
 Brian Eno – "Spirits Drifting"
 Brian Eno – "Alternative 3"
 Brian Eno – "M386"
 Fleetwood Mac – "Albatross"
 Fleetwood Mac – "Jigsaw Puzzle Blues"
 Paul McCartney – "Did We Meet Somewhere Before?"
 MC5 – "High School"
 The Paley Brothers – "You're the Best"
 The Velvet Underground – "Rock & Roll"
 Huey Lewis and the News - "Who Cares"

As well as the following songs by the Ramones:
 "Blitzkrieg Bop"
 "Do You Wanna Dance?"
 "I Just Want to Have Something to Do"
 "I Wanna Be Sedated"
 "I Wanna Be Your Boyfriend"
 "Questioningly"
 "Sheena Is a Punk Rocker"

Reception
Rock 'n' Roll High School received generally positive reviews and has an 81% rating at the review aggregator website Rotten Tomatoes from 26 film critics.

Remake
In July 2008, actor/writer Alex Winter was hired to script a remake of the film for Howard Stern's production company.

In other media
Corman's short-lived comic book publishing imprint, Roger Corman's Cosmic Comics, released a two-issue take on the film in 1995, written by Bob Fingerman with art by Shane Oakley and Jason Lutes. Unable to acquire likeness licenses for the Ramones, the comic instead featured the Melvins.

References

External links 
 
 
 
 
 
 Village Voice interview with director Allan Arkush
 Rock 'n' Roll High School at the TCM Movie Database (archived)

1979 films
1979 comedy films
1979 independent films
1970s American films
1970s English-language films
1970s musical comedy films
1970s teen comedy films
American musical comedy films
American rock music films
American teen comedy films
American high school films
American independent films
Films about juvenile delinquency
Films about musical groups
Films directed by Allan Arkush
Films produced by Roger Corman
Films set in 1980
Films shot in Los Angeles
New World Pictures films
Punk films
Ramones
Sire Records soundtracks
Song recordings produced by Phil Spector